Megachile tutuilae is a species of bee in the family Megachilidae. It was described by Perkins & Cheesman in 1928.

References

Tutuilae
Insects described in 1928